This is a list of Turkish football transfers in the 2016 summer transfer window by club. Only clubs in the 2016–17 Süper Lig are included.

Süper Lig

Adanaspor

In:

Out:

Akhisar Belediyespor

In:

Out:

Alanyaspor

In:

Out:

Antalyaspor

In:

Out:

Beşiktaş

In:

Out:

Bursaspor

In:

Out:

Çaykur Rizespor

In:

Out:

Fenerbahçe

In:

Out:

Galatasaray

In:

Out:

Gaziantepspor

In:

Out:

Gençlerbirliği

In:

Out:

İstanbul Başakşehir

In:

Out:

Karabükspor

In:

Out:

Kasımpaşa

In:

Out:

Kayserispor

In:

Out:

Konyaspor

In:

Out:

Osmanlıspor

In:

Out:

Trabzonspor

In:

Out:

References

Transfers
Turkey
2016